Hazza Subait (Arabic:هزاع سبيت) (born 9 March 2003) is an Emirati footballer, is the son of the former Emirates national team, Subait Khater. He currently plays as a forward for Al-Jazira.

Career
Hazza Subait started his career at Al-Jazira and is a product of the Al-Jazira's youth system, he is among the UAE U20 players. On 2 February 2020, Hazza Subait made his professional debut for Al Jazira against Al-Wahda in the Pro League, replacing Khalifa Al Hammadi .

References

External links
 

2003 births
Living people
Emirati footballers
Al Jazira Club players
UAE Pro League players
Association football forwards
Place of birth missing (living people)